The New Jersey Highlands Coalition is a New Jersey 501c3 non-profit organization that aims to protect the water and the ecological and cultural resources of the New Jersey Highlands, an 860,000 acre rural and agricultural area in the northern and western parts of the state. 

The Highlands serve as a source of drinking water for 5.4 million people, more than half of the state's population. The Coalition has over 1,000 individual members and nearly 80 environmental organizational members.

History
The organization was first formed in 1988 as a program focused on Highlands preservation within the New Jersey Conservation Foundation.

References

External links

Environmental organizations based in New Jersey
Water organizations in the United States
Non-profit organizations based in New Jersey
Organizations established in 1988
1988 establishments in New Jersey